Jhansi Nagar is the 223rd constituency of 403 elected constituencies in the Uttar Pradesh Legislative Assembly. It belongs to the general category. It falls under the Jhansi Lok Sabha seat and Jhansi district. The first M.L.A. of Jhansi, Atma Ram Govind Kher was speaker of the Uttar Pradesh assembly three times.

The seat is currently held by Ravi Sharma of the Bharatiya Janata Party (BJP).

Ravindra Shukla had been the most elected MLA of Jhansi constituency four times.

The population of Jhansi Nagar according to the 2011 census is 549,391 and the literacy rate is 83.81 percent.

The following table contains the list of all the members of the Legislative Assembly and their respective parties from 1951 to 2012.

Election results

2022

See also 
 Legislative Assembly of India
 State Assembly elections in India

References

External links 
 Election Commission of India
 State Election Commission, Uttar Pradesh
 Assembly Constituencies-Post delimitation in Jhansi District
 Jhansi Nagar Nigam Website
 Booth level officers of JHANSI NAGAR
 Bundelkhand Portal of Jhansi

External links
 

Jhansi
Assembly constituencies of Uttar Pradesh